Rajesh Singh (born 1 March 1976) is an Indian cricketer. He made his first-class debut for Manipur in the 2018–19 Ranji Trophy on 7 January 2019. He made his Twenty20 debut for Manipur in the 2018–19 Syed Mushtaq Ali Trophy on 24 February 2019.

References

External links
 

1976 births
Living people
Indian cricketers
Manipur cricketers
Place of birth missing (living people)